Gut (also romanised kut or goot) are the rites performed by Korean shamans, involving offerings and sacrifices to gods, spirits and ancestors. They are characterised by rhythmic movements, songs, oracles and prayers. These rites are meant to create welfare, promoting commitment between the spirits and humankind. The major categories of rites are the naerim-gut, the dodang-gut and the ssitgim-gut.

Through song and dance, the shaman begs the gods to intervene in the fortune of humans. The shaman wears a very colourful costume and normally speaks in ecstasy. During a rite, the shaman changes his or her costume several times. Rituals consist of various phases, called gori.

In Jeju Island, gut rituals involve the recitation of a myth about the deities being invoked, called bon-puri. Similar narratives are also found in mainland shamanism.

Importance of purification
Purity of both the body and the mind is a state that is required for taking part in rituals. Purification is considered necessary for an efficacious communion between living people and ancestral forms. Before any gut is performed, the altar is always purified by fire and water, as part of the first gori of the ritual itself. The colour white, extensively used in rituals, is regarded as a symbol of purity. The purification of the body is performed by burning white paper. Of course these specifics depend upon the Korean shaman's spiritual lineage/house.

Typology of gut rites

Main types

Naerim-gut
This gut is an initiation rite. As part of the rite, someone becomes a shaman by being possessed by spirits who are officiated by Heaven to become gods. This rite is only able to be done through another Korean shaman and cannot be held on one's own. This ritual causes the sinbyeong, a temporary acute psychotic manic episode, to disappear.

Dodang-gut
This communal rite is common in central provinces in South Korea. Its aim is to wish for the well-being and prosperity of a particular village or hamlet. This rite is normally held annually or once every few years. It is always held either around the New Year or in spring or autumn. The dodang-gut is distinguished by giving prominent roles to the female mudang.

Ssitgim-gut
This rite is used to cleanse the spirit of a deceased person. Since ancient times there is a Korean belief that when somebody dies, their body cannot enter the world of the dead because of the impurity of their spirit. The ssitgim-gut washes away this impurity. It is observed mainly in the provinces in the south west of South Korea.

Jaesu-gut (재수굿)
During the sequential performance of the twelve segments that comprise a typical jaesu-gut, more than half of the costumes the mansin wears are male. The most interactive and dynamic portions of the gut usually occur during the mansin'''s possession by the byeolsang (spirits of the other world) and the greedy daegam (the overseer), which require male costumes. This cross-dressing serves several purposes. First, since the mansin is often possessed by both male and female spirits and can thus become an icon of the opposite sex, it is reasonable that she use the attire of both sexes. But in a context in which women are publicly demeaned, where their symbolic value is reduced by strong Confucian ideology, the female mansin's cross-dressing becomes complex and multi-functional.

In semiotic terms, the costume is an icon for the person or the spirit it represents. The mansin in the costume assumes the role of that icon, thereby becoming a female signifying a male; she is a cross-sex icon about 75% of the time during a typical gut. In the context of the gut, the mansin is a sexually liminal being; by signifying a man, she not only has access to the male authority in the Confucian order, she provides the female audience an opportunity to interact with that authority in ways that would, in a public context, be unthinkable. Her performance is often a parody of the male authority figures; she often makes off-color jokes and ribald comments, and argues with the audience.

 Cheondoje'ui (천도제의) 
A kind of gut, which is for unjustly dead, or whose soul may not ascend. It is performed widely.

1. Gut that rescues the soul of a person who has fallen into the water and comforts them and releases their grudge. Examples include mul-gut, sumang-gut, hon-gut, and neokgunjigi-gut;

2. Gut that pray to go to a good place after death. Examples include jinogi-gut, ogu-gut, mangmuki-gut, ssitgim-gut, dari-gut'', etc.;

Regional types
The traditional rites are not linked to the Gregorian calendar. They are linked either to a particular event, such as a death, or the lunar calendar.

See also
 Mu (shaman)
 Muak

References

General bibliography 
 
 

Korean shamanism